Abapeba cayana is a species of spider belonging to the family Corinnidae.

It is native to French Guiana.

References

Corinnidae
Spiders described in 1874
Spiders of South America